Quebec-Centre was a federal electoral district in Quebec, Canada, that was represented in the House of Commons of Canada from 1867 to 1917.

It was created by the British North America Act, 1867. It consisted of Palace Ward, St. Louis Ward, St. John's Ward and the parts of Montcalm Ward and the Banlieue not included in Quebec West or Quebec East ridings. It was abolished in 1914 when it was redistributed into Quebec East and Quebec South ridings.

Members of Parliament

This riding elected the following Members of Parliament:

Election results

By-election: On Mr. Cauchon being appointed President of the Privy Council, 7 December 1875

By-election: On Mr. Cauchon being appointed Lieutenant-Governor of Manitoba, 1877

By-election: On Mr. Langelier being appointed judge, 14 January 1898

By-election: On Mr. Malouin being appointed Puisne Judge of the Superior Court of Quebec, Arthabasca District, 7 January 1905

See also 

 List of Canadian federal electoral districts
 Past Canadian electoral districts

References

External links
Riding history from the Library of Parliament

Former federal electoral districts of Quebec